Leonard Bacon (1887–1954) was an American poet, translator, and literary critic. The great-grandson of preacher Leonard Bacon, he graduated from Yale University in 1909, and subsequently taught at University of California, Berkeley until his retirement in 1923. In 1923, he started publishing poetry in the Saturday Review of Literature under the pseudonym 'Autholycus'. He and his family lived in Florence, Italy from 1927 to 1932. He won the 1941 Pulitzer Prize for Poetry for his satiric poems Sunderland Capture. He was elected a Fellow of the American Academy of Arts and Sciences in 1942.

Works
 The Heroic Ballads of Servia (1913) (translated from Spanish)
 Chanson de Roland (1914) (translated from French)
 The Cid (1919) (translated from Spanish)
 Sophia Trenton (1920)
 Ulug beg (1923)
 Ph.D.s (1925)
 Animula Vagula (1926)
 Guinea-fowl and other Poultry (1927)
 Lost Buffalo, and other Poems (1930)
 Sunderland Capture (1940) (winner of the Pulitzer Prize)
 Day of Fire (1943)

References

External links
Leonard Bacon Papers. Yale Collection of American Literature, Beinecke Rare Book and Manuscript Library.
New York State Literary Tree: Leonard Bacon
 Biographical Notes, Leonard Bacon
 Hervey Allen Papers, 1831-1965, SC.1952.01, Special Collections Department, University of Pittsburgh
 
 

1887 births
1954 deaths
Poets from New York (state)
Fellows of the American Academy of Arts and Sciences
People from Onondaga County, New York
Pulitzer Prize for Poetry winners
University of California, Berkeley College of Letters and Science faculty
Writers from Rhode Island
Yale University alumni
20th-century American poets
Members of the American Academy of Arts and Letters